The World Trail Orienteering Championships (WTOC) were first held in 2004 and annually since them. The majority of the championships were held in Europe, with 2005 the only exception up to date.

The current championship events are:
 PreO - the traditional event
 TempO - competition consisting of timed controls only (since 2013)
 TrailO Relay – for three-person teams (since 2016, replacing the previous team event)

Venues

PreO 
This was called the "individual competition" before 2010.

Open

Paralympic

TempO (since 2013) 
All competitors, regardless of disability, participate in one single class only since there is no physical movement involved in the competition process.

Open

Paralympic

Team competition (before 2015)

Paralympic

Open

Relay (since 2016)

Open

Paralympic

External links 
 World Trail Orienteering Championships 2010
 World Trail Orienteering Championships 2012
 World Trail Orienteering Championships 2013
 World Trail Orienteering Championships 2014
 World Trail Orienteering Championships 2015
 World Trail Orienteering Championships 2016
 World Trail Orienteering Championships 2017
 World Trail Orienteering Championships 2018
 World Trail Orienteering Championships 2019
 World Trail Orienteering Championships 2022

References

External links
 International Orienteering Federation
 WTOC & ETOC results archive

WTOC

 World Trail Orienteering Championships 2010
 World Trail Orienteering Championships 2012
 World Trail Orienteering Championships 2013
 World Trail Orienteering Championships 2014
 World Trail Orienteering Championships 2015
 World Trail Orienteering Championships 2016
 World Trail Orienteering Championships 2017
 World Trail Orienteering Championships 2018
 World Trail Orienteering Championships 2019

 
Trail
Trail orienteers